Lichtenberg Castle may refer to:

in France:
 Château de Lichtenberg near Lichtenberg, Bas-Rhin, Alsace

in Germany:
 Lichtenberg Castle (Palatinate) near Kusel in Rhineland-Palatinate
 Lichtenberg Castle (Oberstenfeld) near Oberstenfeld in Baden-Wuerttemberg
 Lichtenberg Castle (Salzgitter) near Salzgitter in Lower Saxony
 Lichtenberg Castle (Lichtenberg) near Lichtenberg (Upper Franconia) in Bavaria
 Lichtenberg Castle (Saxony) near Lichtenberg/Erzgeb. in Saxony

in Italy
Lichtenberg Castle (Prad) in the Lichtenberg subdivision of Prad am Stilfser Joch.